Club Deportivo Vitoria is a football team based in Vitoria-Gasteiz, in the autonomous community of Basque Country. Founded in 1945, its senior side is currently the farm team of SD Eibar and plays in Tercera Federación – Group 4, with its ground for home fixtures being the Unbe Sports Complex in Eibar, Gipuzkoa.

The club also has a B-team  – competing at the provincial sixth tier level – and a full youth system within its football section, as well as a basketball section.

History
CD Vitoria was founded in 1945 and played in regional categories, promoting several times to third level. Historically, CD Vitoria had their own grounds (Campo Municipal Vitoriana) but for some years had played their home matches at the Betoño Sports Complex. In 2011, they gained promotion from the fifth tier with an unbeaten record.

In 2015, the club signed a collaboration agreement with SD Eibar and started to act as its farm team, initially playing home matches at Arrate stadium, in Nanclares de la Oca. Eibar had previously disbanded their own B team in 2012 to cut costs while their senior team languished in Segunda División B, but they were promoted up to La Liga in successive seasons and decided to seek a new formal arrangement for a subsidiary club. A few months after the agreement, Eibar acquired a local team to act as a further link between the youth level and Vitoria, to be known as Eibar Urko.

One year later, the club was promoted to Segunda División B for the first time, and moved back to Vitoria-Gasteiz to play at Estadio Olaranbe. This decision was controversial as both Deportivo Alavés and Aurrerá Vitoria (owner of the stadium until 1999) protested against it, claiming that the statutes of the ground only allowed its use by teams from the province of Álava – Vitoria met this requirement, but parent club Eibar (from Gipuzkoa) did not.

After securing their status in the division for a second season, in August 2018 Vitoria announced they would play their Segunda División B games at Estadio Ellakuri in the municipality of Laudio/Llodio, while maintaining their base football structure in Vitoria-Gasteiz. They were relegated in 2018–19, which also blocked Eibar Urko's promotion from the provincial level due to rules preventing teams owned by the same club competing in the same division. After Vitoria dropped down to the Tercera, home matches were moved to Eibar, playing at the town's Unbe Sports Complex. The COVID-19 pandemic in Spain led to the following season being halted early, but eventually the 2020 Tercera División play-offs took place: Vitoria were involved but failed to be promoted, again also blocking Urko's promotion. A similar situation occurred at the end of 2020–21.

Season to season 
 As a separate club

As a farm team

2 seasons in Segunda División B
12 seasons in Tercera División
2 seasons in Tercera Federación

Current squad

From youth squad

References

External links
Official website 
Estadios de España 
Futbolme team profile 

Football clubs in the Basque Country (autonomous community)
Association football clubs established in 1945
1945 establishments in Spain
Sport in Vitoria-Gasteiz
Spanish reserve football teams
SD Eibar